The Paulsboro Public Schools is a comprehensive community public school district that serves students in pre-kindergarten through twelfth grade from Paulsboro, in Gloucester County, New Jersey, United States.

As of the 2020–21 school year, the district, comprised of four schools, had an enrollment of 1,186 students and 101.0 classroom teachers (on an FTE basis), for a student–teacher ratio of 11.7:1.

The district is classified by the New Jersey Department of Education as being in District Factor Group "A", the lowest of eight groupings. District Factor Groups organize districts statewide to allow comparison by common socioeconomic characteristics of the local districts. From lowest socioeconomic status to highest, the categories are A, B, CD, DE, FG, GH, I and J.

Students in ninth through twelfth grades from Greenwich Township attend the district's high school as part of a sending/receiving relationship with the Greenwich Township School District.

Schools
Schools in the district (with 2020–21 enrollment data from the National Center for Education Statistics) are:
Elementary schools
Billingsport Early Childhood Center with 304 students in grades PreK-2
Tina Morris, Principal
Loudenslager Elementary School with 351 students in grades 3-6
Matthew J. Browne, Principal
Junior high school
Paulsboro Junior High School with 131 students in grades 7-8
John Giovannitti, Principal
High school
Paulsboro High School with 351 students in grades 9-12
Paul Morina, Principal

Administration
Core members of the district's administration are:
Dr. Roy J. Dawson III, Superintendent
Anisah Coppin, Business Administrator / Board Secretary

Board of education
The district's board of education is comprised of nine members who set policy and oversee the fiscal and educational operation of the district through its administration. As a Type II school district, the board's trustees are elected directly by voters to serve three-year terms of office on a staggered basis, with three seats up for election each year held (since 2013) as part of the November general election; a tenth member is appointed to represent the interests of the Greenwich Township district. The board appoints a superintendent to oversee the district's day-to-day operations and a business administrator to supervise the business functions of the district.

References

External links
Paulsboro Public Schools

School Data for the Paulsboro Public Schools, National Center for Education Statistics

Paulsboro, New Jersey
New Jersey District Factor Group A
School districts in Gloucester County, New Jersey